Admirandopora is an extinct genus of bryozoans which existed in what is now Mongolia during the Early Carboniferous period. It was described by Y. Ariunchimeg in 1996 as "Admiranda", but Ariunchimeg subsequently changed its name in 2012, after it had been discovered that Admiranda was preoccupied by a fossil foraminifer. The new generic name means "surprising pore" in Latin.

References

Prehistoric bryozoan genera
Fossil taxa described in 2012
Extinct bryozoans